Soak City is a water park at Kings Island amusement park in Mason, Ohio.  Opening in 1989 as WaterWorks, the water park is included with the price of admission to Kings Island. It is owned and operated by Cedar Fair.

History
Soak City originally opened in 1989 as a  water park under the name WaterWorks featuring 15 water slides, a wave pool, and a lazy river ride called Action River.  WaterWorks was the first themed area to be added to Kings Island since 1976, bringing the total to seven.  The cost was roughly $4 million USD.

It was renamed in 2004 to Crocodile Dundee's Boomerang Bay, and again in 2007 to Boomerang Bay dropping Crocodile Dundee from the name. On September 2, 2011, Kings Island announced that the water park would undergo a $10-million expansion, which would include the renovation of the water park's main entrance, a revamp of the existing Lazy River ride, and the construction of additional amenities. A second, larger wave pool was also added, and the water park's name was changed to Soak City for the 2012 season.

List of attractions

See also

 Other Soak City locations
 List of Cedar Fair water parks

Notes

References

External links
 

Cedar Fair water parks
Water parks in Ohio
1989 establishments in Ohio